The 1915 Wake Forest Baptists football team represented Wake Forest College during the 1915 college football season.

Schedule

References

Wake Forest
Wake Forest Demon Deacons football seasons
Wake Forest Baptists football